Coaches vs. Cancer may refer to:

The 2K Sports Classic, an annual American college basketball tournament known from 1995 to 2011 as the Coaches vs. Cancer Classic
The Coaches vs. Cancer Classic, an annual American college basketball tournament held from 2012 to 2014